Walker's Ridge Cemetery is a small Commonwealth War Graves Commission cemetery located near Suvla Bay in Turkey. It contains the remains of Allied soldiers killed during the Battle of Gallipoli.

It was constructed on a spur which was named by the occupying troops after the headquarters of the New Zealand Infantry Brigade, under the command of Brigadier-General Harold Walker, which was located there. The cemetery was formed during the occupation in 1915 and is divided into two plots 20 metres apart and originally separated by a trench.

Notable graves

Amongst the graves is that of 23-year-old Trooper Harold Rush of the 10th Australian Light Horse regiment. Rush was in the third wave of troops to charge Turkish trenches at the battle of the Nek on 7 August 1915. Seeing that previous two waves had been slaughtered, just before his wave attacked he turned to a fellow soldier and said "Goodbye Cobber,  God bless you". His parents had these last words recorded on his grave marker.

References

External links

 

Commonwealth War Graves Commission cemeteries in Gallipoli